Vrabel, Vrábel, Vrábeľ, or Vrabelj is a surname. It means "sparrow" in some dialects of Czech, Slovak, Slovene, and related languages. It is cognate with the Polish surname Wróbel.

Notable people with the surname include:
 Jaroslav Vrábel (born 1971), Czech footballer
 Martin Vrábeľ (born 1955), Czech long-distance runner
 Mike Vrabel (born 1975), American football coach
 Ondrej Vrábel (philanthropist) (born 2001), is a Slovak philanthropist, programmer and entrepreneur
 Ondrej Vrábel (footballer) (born 1999), Slovak footballer 
 Tanja Vrabel (born 1990), Slovenian footballer

See also
 

Czech-language surnames
Slovak-language surnames
Slovene-language surnames